Blackenday is the seventh album by Italian progressive metal band Eldritch, released in 2007 and attended by guests as Ray Alder and Nicolas Van Dyk.

Track listing 
"Silent Flame" — 4:47
"The Deep Sleep" — 3:23
"The Blackened Day" — 4:47
"Why?" — 3:38
"Black Rain" — 3:29
"Broken Road" — 4:53
"Rumors" — 5:29
"Frozen" — 4:30
"The Child That Never Smiles" — 3:23
"The Fire" — 3:45
"Shallow Water Flood" — 4:32
"Never Dawn" — 4:20

References

2007 albums
Eldritch (band) albums
Limb Music albums